Roger de Saivre (1908-1964) was a French politician. A supporter of the Révolution nationale, he served as co-Cabinet Secretary to Marshal Philippe Pétain from 1941 to 1942. He was deported to the Dachau concentration camp for his vocal criticisms of the Nazi invaders in 1943. After liberation in 1945, he served as a member of the National Assembly, from 1951 to 1955 representing French Algeria. He was a proponent of the French Empire.

Early life
Roger de Saivre was born on May 14, 1908, in Paris.

He studied the Law and became a leader of the Jeunesses Patriotes by 1927. He edited their monthly newspaper, Les étudiants de France, with a circulation of 10,000. He graduated from Sciences Po in 1931.

Career
He became the editor-in-chief of National in 1932.

He was a staunch supporter of the Révolution nationale, and a vehement opponent of Nazism. In October 1940, with Henry Pugibet, he co-founded Jeunesse de France et d'outre-mers, a youth organization meant to spread the Révolution nationale among the colonial youths.

He served as the co-Cabinet Secretary to Marshal Philippe Pétain from July 1941 to December 1942, alongside Henry du Moulin de Labarthète. De Saivre was in charge of French Algerian affairs in the cabinet; from July 1942 to December 1942, he was assisted by Georges Demay. He was fired in December 1942 for his criticism of the Nazi invaders.

He was arrested by the Nazis on December 24, 1942, and jailed at the Château du Hâ, followed by the Fresnes Prison. In April 1943, he was taken to the Dachau concentration camp. He was liberated in May 1945. Shortly after the war, he became a founding member of the Association for the Defence of the Memory of Marshal Pétain.

He served as a member of the National Assembly for Oran, French Algeria from June 17, 1951, to December 1, 1955. He was critical of the "excesses" of the épuration légale. He was an unwavering supporter of the French Empire, including French Algeria and French Indochina.

Death
He died on December 13, 1964, in Paris.

References

1908 births
1964 deaths
Politicians from Paris
Republican Federation politicians
Deputies of the 2nd National Assembly of the French Fourth Republic
French nationalists
French Algeria
Sciences Po alumni
Dachau concentration camp survivors
Order of the Francisque recipients